The Granville Mall is a transit mall and pedestrian zone in Vancouver, British Columbia, Canada. It comprises the section of Granville Street in Downtown Vancouver between Hastings and Smithe streets. Most routes that service the mall are primarily trolleybuses operated by TransLink; in addition to bus service, the Granville Mall can be accessed by SkyTrain from either Granville and Vancouver City Centre stations of the Expo and Canada lines, respectively.

History

The idea of closing off a section of Granville Street to automobile traffic arose after the city withdrew its freeway plan in 1968 due to community opposition. The city concluded that automobile use within downtown should be restricted in order to avoid overloading the area's street network, and subsequently designated the section of Granville between Hastings and Nelson streets a pedestrian and transit mall. The Granville Mall opened for service on September 15, 1974.

The Downtown Vancouver Association sought to re-open Granville between Nelson and Georgia streets to general traffic, and the city proceeded with that proposal in 1987 on a trial basis. The trial was declared unsuccessful and cancelled the following year, although the city did re-open one block between Nelson and Smithe streets to general traffic in 1989, widening the section to four lanes.

On April 24, 2006, the mall between Robson Street and Hastings Street was closed to all traffic, including transit buses, to allow construction of the Canada Line subway and Vancouver City Centre station. During this closure, buses were re-routed to Seymour Street (northbound), Howe Street (southbound, routes crossing the Granville Street Bridge), and Richards Street (southbound, routes within downtown). As part of this construction, the 800, 600, and 500 blocks of Granville (between Smithe and Robson, and then again between Georgia and Pender) were open to all traffic, northbound, including on-street metered parking.

Before its closure, the Granville Mall was used by over 1,900 buses (90% electric trolleybuses) and 47,500+ transit riders on weekdays. Following studies and consultations, Vancouver City Council decided in the spring of 2006 to carry out a redesign of the mall after completion of the Canada Line subway under the street. Trolleybus service on the mall resumed on September 7, 2010; the buses continue to use Howe and Seymour streets in the evenings on weekends and holidays.

Entertainment district

In somewhat of a contrast to the hustle and bustle of transit during the day, the centre portion of the Granville Mall and nearby streets play host to the city's primary urban retail and adult nightlife district after the evening rush hour. Known simply as the Granville Entertainment District contains countless bars, dance clubs, venues, restaurants, hotels, and shops with neon lights and a particularly urban gritty vibe are open daily until late into the night and extend to the wee hours of morning on weekends.  The entertainment district was created by city zoning policies, concentrating adult nightlife operations which had previously been scattered throughout the greater downtown peninsula.

References

External links
Granville Street Redesign Project website (archived)

Streets in Vancouver
Busking venues
Pedestrian malls in Canada
1974 establishments in British Columbia